Gay Love is a 1934 British musical comedy film directed by Leslie S. Hiscott and starring Florence Desmond, Sophie Tucker and Sydney Fairbrother. It is about two sisters.

The film was made at Beaconsfield Studios. The film's sets were designed by Norman G. Arnold.

Cast
 Florence Desmond as Gloria Fellowes  
 Sophie Tucker as Sophie Tucker - Singer  
 Sydney Fairbrother as Dukie  
 Enid Stamp-Taylor as Marie Hopkins  
 Ivor McLaren as Lord Tony Eaton  
 Garry Marsh as Freddie Milton  
 Leslie Perrins as Gerald Sparkes  
 Ben Welden as Ben  
 Finlay Currie as Highams

References

Bibliography
 Low, Rachael. Filmmaking in 1930s Britain. George Allen & Unwin, 1985.
 Wood, Linda. British Films, 1927-1939. British Film Institute, 1986.

External links
 Gay Love at IMDb

1934 films
British musical comedy films
1934 musical comedy films
1930s English-language films
Films shot at Beaconsfield Studios
Films directed by Leslie S. Hiscott
British black-and-white films
Films with screenplays by John Paddy Carstairs
1930s British films